Beijing railway station, or simply Beijing station, is a passenger railway station in Dongcheng District, Beijing.  The station is located just southeast of the city centre inside the Second Ring Road with Beijing Station Street to the north and the remnants of the city wall between Chongwenmen and Dongbianmen to the south. The Beijing railway station opened in 1959 and was the largest train station in China at the time. Though superseded by the larger Beijing West and Beijing South stations, this station remains the only one located inside the old walled city.  Trains entering and leaving the station pass by the Dongbianmen corner tower.  With gilded eaves and soaring clock towers, the architecture of the railway blends traditional Chinese and socialist realist influence.

Generally, trains for northeast China (Shenyang, Dalian, Harbin) on the Beijing–Harbin railway, for Shandong (Jinan, Qingdao) and the Yangtze River Delta (Shanghai, Nanjing and Hangzhou) on the Beijing–Shanghai railway and some for Inner and the Republic of Mongolia depart from this station. Some international lines (notably the railway line linking Beijing to Moscow and to Pyongyang, North Korea (DPRK), amongst others), also depart from this station.

The Beijing Subway's first line used to terminate at Beijing railway station from 1969 to 1981. The subway station is now a stop on Line 2.  More than 30 Beijing bus and trolleybus routes stop at or near the railway station.

History

Predecessor station
The Beijing railway station's predecessor was the Zhengyangmen railway station, also called the Beijing station, which was located  due west, just outside Zhengyangmen (also known as Qianmen), a gate in the city wall directly south of Tiananmen Square.  The Zhengyangmen railway station was built in 1901 and served as the terminus of the Kaiping Tramway and Imperial Railways of North China, also known as the Beijing–Shanhaiguan Railway until 1959 when the station closed after the opening of the current Beijing railway station and has become part of the China Railway Museum.

Design and construction
To commemorate the Tenth Anniversary of the founding of the People's Republic of China, the Central Committee of the Chinese Communist Party in 1958 began the planning and construction of ten large-scale projects, known as the "Ten Great Buildings" to showcase the new outlook of the country and the Beijing railway station was amongst the projects undertaken.

In late October 1958, according to the early 1950 Beijing municipal government's construction and planning records, the design arrangements for the new railway station was commenced. The station's design was assigned to the Ministry of Railway Institute's third department (now the Third Railway Survey and Design Institute Group Co. Ltd) with the station house building chaired by then renowned architects Yang Tingbao and Chen Deng'ao, the National Building and Industry Department and the Nanjing Institute of Architectural Design were to cooperate in the design tasks. The station's design progressed rapidly and by early December the same year, the whole design proposal was completed. On December 10, the design proposal was approved by the Central Committee. The then Premier Zhou Enlai was also very concerned about the design and construction of the new Beijing railway station, and dealt with aspects concerning the direction and positioning of station names to the layout of the VIP room environment. In determining the design program proposal, Zhou Enlai proposed that turrets be built on each of the two wings of the main building and this suggestion was adopted.

On January 20, 1959 the construction of the new station commenced with the number of construction workers reaching up to two million people during the peak stage and project investment amounted to 57.82 million yuan. Soviet experts were also hired to give technical guidance at the construction sites. In just over seven months, the project was completed on September 10, 1959. The new Beijing railway station covered an area of two hundred and fifty thousand square meters, the Station House Building site covered an area of 46,700 square meters, the station plaza comprised an area of forty thousand square meters.  Chairman Mao Zedong wrote the calligraphic characters in the station sign.

The Beijing railway station was one of the largest construction projects in mainland China during that time with modern facilities and it was also China's first large modern railway terminal. At the time of completion, the station has a twelve tracks and six railway platforms with canopies attached to them. The Station house building faced south and the architecture included both a Chinese traditional style and the Soviet Stalinist architecture。The twelve passenger waiting rooms comprised a total area of fourteen thousand square meters and was able to accommodate 14,000 waiting passengers. The inner complex of the Main Station Building contained a passenger waiting room, mother and child waiting room, movie theater, recreation hall, visitors' restaurants, post office, clinic and other facilities. Installed on the roof of the Station House were two marble clock faces and every morning from 7am to 9pm the bell sounded punctually and "The East Is Red song is played out.

The Beijing station equipment was considered to be relatively advanced at its -time with four AC2-59 type escalators installed in the interior; the joint design and production of the escalators were coordinated by the Shanghai Jiao Tong University and Shanghai Elevator Company. The four sets of escalators were replaced during the 1980 and again during 1990; the most recent replacement of the elevators occurred in early 2005 - the design being a product of Otis Company.

Operation

China Railway

After the completion of the new Beijing railway station, its transport capacity far exceeded the formerly used East railway station and it played an increasing role in heavy transport tasks, and today it is still Beijing's most important passenger railway station, and has the largest station traffic in China. The number of trains and traffic has also increased year by year: In 1959 there were 33 train lines; in 1966 there were forty train lines; in 1978 there were sixty-one train lines; in 1985 there were seventy-eight train lines; and by 1993 there were eighty-two train lines. During the late 1950s, the number of passengers using the railway transportation system was six million people a year, in the late 1960 it was eight million people a year, in the late 1970 it reached fifteen million a year, and after the Chinese economic reform period, the usage soared to more than thirty million people. To alleviate the transport pressure on the Beijing railway station, the Beijing Municipal Government and the Ministry of Railways in 1980 started the planning and construction of Beijing's second passenger station and hence the Beijing West railway station was completed in 1996, which provided transportation links for the Beijing–Guangzhou Railway and Beijing–Kowloon Railway helped alleviate pressure on the Beijing railway station - this led to a reduction in passenger traffic for the Beijing railway station to twenty million people.

Since 1976, the Beijing railway station had begun a series of upgrades to the passenger service facilities, for example a computer system had been set up for processing tickets, a TV monitoring screen, wireless communication, automatic broadcasting system, and extensions made to the railway platform expanded its length from 497 to 603 metres in order to meet the needs of the expanding transportation flow. In 1988, the Shanghai Electric Clock Factory installed China's first large screen display system in the Beijing railway station square. Between May 1998 and September 1999, the Ministry of Railways implemented a seismic strengthening project to the Beijing railway station and also introduced new passenger features such as a central air conditioning system, passenger guidance system, multi-functional radio broadcasting system. Since June 18, 2003, the Beijing railway station began an expansion of two new sites, comprising an area of 20,513 square meters and includes a specialized large parcel luggage line, renovations included the removal of the concrete canopy, alterations to the steel arch station poles, and alterations to the original site raised it from 1 to 1.2 meters.

In June 2008, in order to meet the needs of the Beijing Olympic Games, bilingual signs were created at the Beijing railway station to facilitate an overall increase in foreign tourists travelling to the games, in addition to putting up the English name "Beijing Railway Station", several other signs were also erected at station entrances, exits and ticket booths.

On June 25, 2021, G902/903 and G907/908 trains will be extended to Beijing railway station, thus the Beijing-Shenyang high-speed railway has charted trains arriving and departing at Beijing railway station.

Beijing Subway

The Beijing railway station is a transportation hub in Beijing.
 Beijing Subway: Line 2 stops at the Beijing railway station, with Entrance D on the station plaza.
 Beijing Bus routes and stops near the station:
Beijing Station East 250 m east of the station plaza: 9, 10, 20, 25, 29, 39, 52, 59, 122, 203, 204, 209, 403, 420, 434, 637, 638, 639,  666, 668, 673, 674, 729, 804, 805, 827, 829, 938, 957
Beijing Station West 280 m west of the station plaza: 103, 104, 208, 209, 211, 673
Beijing Station Front Street 290 m north of the station plaza: 9, 24, 204, 673, 674, 729, 804, 
Beijing Station Intersection East on Chang'an Avenue, 600 m north of the station plaza: 1, 52, 90, 99, 120, 126, 205, 208, 420, 637, 666, 728, 
Jianguomen Bridge South 900 m east of the station plaza on the Second Ring Road: 25, 39, 43, 44, 52, 122, 434, 637, 638, 750, 
Beijing Airport Bus Route 3 has a terminus located about 300 m east of the station plaza.
Bus route numbers in bold denotes bus terminus.

Station Layout 
The station has an underground island platform.

Exits 
There are four exits, lettered A, B, C, and D. Exit A is accessible.

Sister stations
Seoul Station, South Korea
Tokyo Station (concluded 1980) and Ueno Station (concluded 1980), Japan

Notes

External links 

 Official site
 Beijing Train Schedule

Railway stations in China opened in 1959
Contemporary Chinese architecture
Railway stations in Dongcheng District, Beijing
Beijing Subway stations in Dongcheng District